On July 23, 1982, a Bell UH-1 Iroquois helicopter crashed at Indian Dunes in Valencia, California, United States, during the making of Twilight Zone: The Movie. The crash killed actor Vic Morrow and child actors Myca Dinh Le and Renee Shin-Yi Chen, who were on the ground, and injured the six helicopter passengers. The incident led to years of civil and criminal action against the personnel overseeing the shoot, including director John Landis, and the introduction of new procedures and safety standards in the filmmaking industry.

Background
Twilight Zone: The Movie featured four segments. In the script for the first segment, "Time Out", character Bill Connor (Vic Morrow) is transported back in time to the Vietnam War, where he has become a Vietnamese man protecting two children from American troops.

Filmmaker John Landis, who directed this first segment, violated California's child labor laws by hiring seven-year-old Myca Dinh Le and six-year-old Renee Shin-Yi Chen without the required permits. Landis and several other staff members were also responsible for a number of labor violations connected with other people involved in the accident, which came to light afterwards.

The children were hired after Peter Wei-Teh Chen, Renee's uncle, was approached by a colleague whose wife was a production secretary for the film. Chen first thought of his brother's six-year-old daughter Renee, whose parents agreed to let her participate. He then called a Vietnamese colleague, Daniel Le, who had a seven-year-old son named Myca. Myca was an outgoing boy who enjoyed posing for pictures, so his parents thought he would be interested. Chen later testified that he was never informed that either of the children would be in proximity to a helicopter or explosives.

Le and Chen were being paid under the table to circumvent state law, which did not permit children to work at night. Landis opted not to seek a special waiver, either because he did not think that he would get permission for such a late hour or because he knew that he would not get approval to have young children in a scene with a large number of explosives. Casting agents were unaware that the children would be involved in the scene. Associate producer George Folsey Jr. told the children's parents not to tell any firefighters on the set that the children were part of the scene and hid them from a fire safety officer who also worked as a welfare worker. A fire safety officer was concerned that the blasts would cause a crash, but he did not tell Landis of his concerns.

Accident

The filming location was Indian Dunes, a movie ranch in the Valencia neighborhood of what is now the city Santa Clarita, California, that was used throughout the 1980s in films and television shows, including The Color Purple, Escape from New York, MacGyver, and China Beach. The location was within the 30-mile zone, its wide-open area permitted more pyrotechnic effects, and it was possible to shoot night scenes without city lights visible in the background. Indian Dunes'  also featured a wide topography of green hills, dry desert, dense woods, and jungle-like riverbeds along the Santa Clara River which made it suitable to double for locations around the world, including Afghanistan, Myanmar, Brazil, and Vietnam.

The night scene called for Morrow's character to carry the two children out of a deserted village and across a shallow river while being pursued by American soldiers in a hovering helicopter. The helicopter was piloted by Vietnam War veteran Dorcey Wingo. During the filming, Wingo stationed his helicopter  from the ground, while hovering near a large mortar effect; he then turned the aircraft 180 degrees to the left for the next camera shot. The effect was detonated while the helicopter's tail-rotor was still above it, causing the rotor to fail and detach from the tail. The low-flying helicopter spun out of control. At the same time, Morrow dropped Chen into the water. He was reaching out to grab her when the helicopter fell on top of him and the two children. Morrow and Le were decapitated by the helicopter's main rotor blades, while Chen was crushed to death by the helicopter's right landing skid; all three died almost instantly.

At the trial, the defense claimed that the explosions were detonated at the wrong time. Randall Robinson, an assistant cameraman on board the helicopter, testified that production manager Dan Allingham told Wingo, "That's too much. Let's get out of here," when the explosions were detonated, but Landis shouted over the radio: "Get lower... lower! Get over [lower]!" Robinson said that Wingo tried to leave the area, but that "we lost our control and regained it and then I could feel something let go and we began spinning around in circles." Stephen Lydecker, another camera operator on board, testified that Landis had earlier "shrugged off" warnings about the stunt with the comment, "We may lose the helicopter." Lydecker acknowledged that Landis might have been joking when he made the remark, but added, "I learned not to take anything the man said as a joke. It was his attitude. He didn't have time for suggestions from anybody."

Investigation
In October 1984, the National Transportation Safety Board (NTSB) issued its report on the accident. The probable cause of the accident was the detonation of debris-laden high temperature special effects explosions too near to a low-flying helicopter, leading to foreign object damage to one rotor blade and delamination due to heat to the other rotor blade, the separation of the helicopter's tail rotor assembly, and the uncontrolled descent of the helicopter. The proximity of the helicopter to the special effects explosions was due to the failure to establish direct communications and coordination between the pilot, who was in command of the helicopter operation, and the film director, who was in charge of the filming operation.

The Federal Aviation Administration (FAA) had just instituted regulations the previous March to define how aircraft were to be regulated during film and television productions. The new regulations, however, only covered fixed-wing aircraft and not helicopters. As a result of the fatal accident, the NTSB recommended that the terms be extended to apply to all types of aircraft. In response, the FAA "amend[ed] Order 8440.5A, Chapter 14, Section 5 to clarify and emphasize that helicopter low-level movie making operations do require a certificate of waiver"; this language was officially incorporated in 1986.

Aftermath
The accident led to civil and criminal action against the filmmakers which lasted nearly a decade. Le's father, Daniel Lee, testified that he heard Landis instructing the helicopter to fly lower. All four parents testified that they were never told that there would be helicopters or explosives on set, and they had been reassured that there would be no danger, only noise. Lee, who had survived the Vietnam War and immigrated with his wife to the United States, was horrified when the explosions began on the Vietnamese village set, bringing back memories of the war.

Landis, Folsey, Wingo, production manager Allingham, and explosives specialist Paul Stewart were tried and acquitted on charges of manslaughter in a nine-month trial in 1986 and 1987. In the course of cross-examination, Wingo expressed his regret that Morrow had not looked "up at the helicopter" as he claimed he had instructed him to do, stating when questioned that Morrow "had over five seconds between the time that the sound of the helicopter changed and that impact", but later clarifying that he was not attempting to place blame. Wingo's comments were roundly derided, including by the prosecutor, Deputy District Attorney Lea Purwin D'Agostino, who during cross-examination had responded to Wingo's suggestion that Morrow could have evaded the helicopter by questioning how exactly Wingo expected him to have done so, observing that "Morrow was carrying the two youngsters in his arms while standing almost knee-deep in water as the helicopter, which had been hovering at 24 feet, spun toward him" and calling the testimony "quite amazing" and questioning how Wingo could "possibly have thought that Vic Morrow could have done anything to escape that helicopter under those circumstances and conditions? It's a classic example of a defense. They're blaming the parents, they're blaming the fire safety officers, they're out here blaming everyone. Now they're blaming the dead man. It's incredible." Morrow's family settled within a year; the children's families collected millions of dollars from several civil lawsuits.

As a result of the accident, second assistant director Andy House had his name removed from the credits of Twilight Zone: The Movie and replaced with "Alan Smithee". It was the first time that a director was charged due to a fatality on a set. The trial was described as "long, controversial and bitterly divisive".

Screen Actors Guild (SAG) spokesman Mark Locher said at the conclusion of the trial: "The entire ordeal has shaken the industry in its bottom." Warner Bros. set up dedicated safety committees to establish acceptable standards "for every aspect of filmmaking, from gunfire to fixed-wing aircraft to smoke and pyrotechnics." The standards are regularly issued as safety bulletins and published as the Injury and Illness Prevention Program (IIPP) Safety Manual for Television & Feature Production. The IIPP manual is "a general outline of safe work practices to be used as a guideline for productions to provide a safe work environment" and is distributed to all studio employees.

The Directors Guild of America's safety committee began publishing regular safety bulletins for its members and established a telephone hotline to "enable directors to get quick answers to safety questions." The guild also began to discipline its members for violations of its safety procedures on sets, which it had not done prior to the crash. The SAG introduced a 24-hour hotline and safety team for its members and "encouraged members to use the right of refusal guaranteed in contracts if they believe a scene is unsafe." Filming accidents fell by 69.6-percent between 1982 and 1986, although there were still six deaths on sets.

In 1987, the Office of the State Fire Marshal started the 
Motion Picture & Entertainment Safety Program in response to the accident and to industry concerns about inconsistent enforcement of fire prevention regulations and requirements. The program oversees motion picture and television industry use of pyrotechnic special effects in California.

Landis spoke about the accident in a 1996 interview: "There was absolutely no good aspect about this whole story. The tragedy, which I think about every day, had an enormous impact on my career, from which I may possibly never recover."

Filmmaker Steven Spielberg co-produced Twilight Zone: The Movie with Landis, but he broke off their friendship following the accident. Spielberg said that the crash "made me grow a little" and left everyone who worked on the movie "sick to the center of our souls". He added: "No movie is worth dying for. I think people are standing up much more now than ever before to producers and directors who ask too much. If something isn't safe, it's the right and responsibility of every actor or crew member to yell 'Cut!'"

In popular culture
The accident and criminal trial were the subjects of an episode of E! True Hollywood Story in 2000, as well as the 2020 docuseries Cursed Films.

See also
List of film and television accidents

References

Further reading

Chopper Down: Helicopter Deaths In The Movies (movie)

1982 in American cinema
1982 in California
1982 in Los Angeles
1982 deaths
Accidents and incidents involving helicopters
Aviation accidents and incidents in California
Aviation accidents and incidents in the United States in 1982
Child deaths
Child labor in the United States
Cinema of California
Criminal trials that ended in acquittal
Deaths by decapitation
Disasters in Los Angeles
Film controversies in the United States
Filmed deaths in the United States
Filmed deaths of entertainers
July 1982 events in the United States
Manslaughter trials
Santa Clarita, California
20th-century American trials
The Twilight Zone